Lake Biwa is a studio album by American jazz trumpeter and composer Wadada Leo Smith released on John Zorn's Tzadik label in 2004. The album contains four pieces composed between 2000 and 2004.

Reception

The Allmusic review states: "Lake Biwa is a delight, and is full of invention. The players here perform the work's written and improvised sections with a determined sense of attack that also includes warmth, humor, and the desire for collective discovery".
Writing for All About Jazz, Kurt Gottschalk commented "Over four pieces ranging from 10 to 25 minutes, the ensemble truly is an orchestra. When called upon to step forward, the voices of Ribot and Zorn especially are unmistakable. But the rest of the time, the group breathes together like an orchestra rather than a session group group reading charts. The compositions themselves are both serious and exciting and violinist Jennifer Choi (a regular performer of Zorn's compositions) especially shines".

Track listing
All compositions by Wadada Leo Smith.
 "Lake Biwa; A Fullmoon Purewater Gold"  - 11:14
 "Sinai's Enclosed Garden of the Truth" - 23:50
 "Diamondback Serpent in a House Full of Water and Still Rising" - 16:00
 "Africana World" - 18:30

Personnel
Wadada Leo Smith - trumpet
John Zorn - alto saxophone
Marcus Rojas - tuba
Jennifer Choi - violin
Erik Friedlander - cello
Marc Ribot - guitar
Anthony Coleman, Yuko Fujiyama, Jamie Saft, Craig Taborn - piano
Wes Brown, John Lindberg - bass
Gerald Cleaver, Susie Ibarra, Kwaku Kwaakye Obeng - drums

References

2004 albums
Tzadik Records albums
Wadada Leo Smith albums